is a railway station in the city of Ōgaki, Gifu Prefecture, Japan, operated by the private railway operator Tarumi Railway.

Lines

Station layout
Higashi-Ōgaki Station has one ground-level island platform connected to the station building by a level crossing. The station is unattended.

Adjacent stations

|-
!colspan=5|Tarumi Railway

History
Higashi-Ōgaki Station opened on March 20, 1956.

Surrounding area

Ono Elementary School
Ōgaki Commercial High School

See also
 List of Railway Stations in Japan

References

External links

 

Railway stations in Gifu Prefecture
Railway stations in Japan opened in 1956
Stations of Tarumi Railway
Ōgaki